Chergach is a meteorite found at southwest of El Mokhtar, Erg Chech, Timbuktu district, Mali.
It fell on 2 or 3 July 2007, in daytime, and was composed of ordinary chondrite (H5).

History
Desert nomads reported that during daytime in July 2007 several detonations were heard over a wide area, a smoke cloud was seen and several stones fell from the sky, however no fireball was reported. Ouled Bleila was the finder of the first meteorites, but he died in October 2007 in a car accident on his way back from the trip to the Chergach strewn field.

See also
 Glossary of meteoritics

Notes

External links

 CHERGACH, images of a specimen at Meteorite Recon

Meteorites found in Mali
2007 in Mali